B & G Sides, Vol. 1-4 is a compilation album combining B & G Sides, Vol. 1, B & G Sides, Vol. 2, B & G Sides, Vol. 3, and B & G Sides, Vol. 4.  It was released as a full set in 2008.  The compilation is available only as an export outside the US.

Track listing

 "The Painter (Intro)" - 0:49
 "See and Be Scene" - 3:06
 "Don't Shake My Tree" - 3:04
 "The Sound of Coming Down (Intro)" - 1:31
 "Everything Away" - 3:48
 "I Like Your Hair Long" - 3:58
 "Go Die (Intro)" - 1:49
 "12345678" - 3:28
 "Come Back To Me" - 3:55
 "Teenage Girls Hold the Keys to the World" - 1:53
 "The Sound of Coming Down" - 3:25
 "The Painter" - 6:48

References

The Hard Lessons albums
2008 compilation albums